The  Washington Redskins season was the franchise's 19th season in the National Football League (NFL) and their 7th in Washington, D.C. The team failed to improve on their 4–7–1 record from 1949 and finished 3-9.

Schedule

Standings

Washington
Washington Redskins seasons
Washington Redskins